Catesbaeeae is a flowering plant tribe in the subfamily Cinchonoideae.

Genera 
 Bikkia
 Catesbaea
 Ceuthocarpus
 Coutaportla
 Coutarea
 Cubanola
 Hintonia
 Isidorea
 Nernstia
 Osa
 Portlandia
 Schmidtottia
 Siemensia
 Thogsennia

References

External links 
 

 
Cinchonoideae tribes